Fredy Schmidtke (1 July 1961 – 1 December 2017) was a German track cyclist. He won a gold medal in the 1000 metres time trial at the 1984 Summer Olympics and finished eighth in the sprint.

Schmidtke died of a heart attack on 1 December 2017, at the age of 56.

References

External links

Profile at DatabaseOlympics.com
1000 m Time Trial  at Full Olympians

1961 births
2017 deaths
German male cyclists
Cyclists at the 1984 Summer Olympics
Olympic cyclists of West Germany
Olympic gold medalists for West Germany
Cyclists from Cologne
Olympic medalists in cycling
Medalists at the 1984 Summer Olympics
German track cyclists